Saint-Dominique-du-Rosaire is a municipality in the Canadian province of Quebec, located in the Abitibi Regional County Municipality. It is part of the census agglomeration of Amos.

Demographics
The municipality had a population of 434 in the 2011 Canadian Census.  As of the 2006 census, mother tongues spoken are:
 English as first language: 0%
 French as first language: 100%
 English and French as first language: 0%
 Other as first language: 0%

Population trend:
 Population in 2011: 434 (2006 to 2011 population change: -2.9%)
 Population in 2006: 447
 Population in 2001: 476 (or 466 when adjusted to 2006 boundaries)
 Population in 1996: 457
 Population in 1991: 479

Municipal council
 Mayor: Maurice Godbout
 Councillors: Michel J. Audette, Josiane Ferron, Christian Legault, Daniel St-Pierre, Gisèle St-Pierre, Patricia Vaillancourt

References

Municipalities in Quebec
Incorporated places in Abitibi-Témiscamingue